Ian Brennan may refer to:

 Ian Brennan (cricketer) (born 1930), New Zealand cricketer
 Ian Brennan (footballer) (born 1953), English former footballer
 Ian Brennan (music producer) (born 1966), American music producer
 Ian Brennan (sculptor) (born 1950), British sculptor
 Ian Brennan (writer) (born 1978), American television writer, actor, producer and director